David George Sills (March 21, 1938 – August 23, 2011) was an American jurist. Sills served as the presiding justice for the California Court of Appeal for the Fourth Appellate District, Division Three. He was a former mayor of Irvine, California, the largest planned city in the United States.

Background
From 1964 to 1968, Sills was married to Maureen Reagan, the daughter of U.S. President Ronald Reagan.  He was a member of the Republican State Central Committee of California from 1966 to 1968 and Chairman of the Republican Associates of Orange County from 1968 to 1969.

Sills was appointed as a judge to California's Superior Court in 1985 by Governor George Deukmejian and served there until being promoted to be the Presiding Justice at the Court of Appeal again by Governor Deukmejian in 1990, where he served with distinction and exemplary leadership. He authored approximately 2,400 legal opinions. He received a B.S. from Bradley University in 1959 and his legal degree from the University of Illinois College of Law in 1961. Prior to being named to the bench he served in the U.S. Marine Corps between 1960 and 1965, reaching the rank of captain. He had a private law practice in Orange County, California between 1965 and 1985 and was an elected member of the Irvine City Council between 1976 and 1985, serving as mayor for four years during that period. During his tenure he worked with the Council to responsibly manage the rapid growth Irvine was experiencing at the time.

Sills was also the Irvine Health Foundation's founding Chairman and remained for 26 years. During his service over $25 Million was granted to philanthropic organizations in Orange County to improve health issues for those in need.

Prior to developing knee problems, Sills was a marathon runner who often competed in the Boston Marathon. He enjoyed wood working and had a full range of tools and machines in his garage, fondly known as the "Sills Cabinet Shop." Sills had an extensive library at his Irvine home and studied history and politics.

References

1938 births
2011 deaths
People from Peoria, Illinois
Military personnel from Illinois
California Republicans
Reagan family
Bradley University alumni
University of Illinois College of Law alumni
Judges of the California Courts of Appeal
Mayors of Irvine, California
California city council members